Christian Erlandsen (2 March 1926, Aker – 10 October 2016) was a Norwegian physician and politician for the Conservative Party.

He was elected to the Norwegian Parliament from Hedmark in 1977, and was re-elected on one occasion. He later served as a deputy representative during the term 1989–1993.

On the local level he was a member of Stange municipal council from 1963 to 1977 and 1987 to 1995. From 1975 to 1979 and 1987 to 1999 he was a deputy member of Hedmark county council. He chaired the local party chapter from 1994 to 1999.

Outside politics he graduated with a cand.med. degree from the University of Copenhagen in 1952, specialized in psychiatry in 1963 and worked at Sanderud Hospital.

References

1926 births
2016 deaths
Members of the Storting
Hedmark politicians
Conservative Party (Norway) politicians
Norwegian psychiatrists
University of Copenhagen alumni
20th-century Norwegian politicians